Kristers Gudļevskis (born 31 July 1992) is a Latvian professional ice hockey goaltender for Modo Hockey of HockeyAllsvenskan. Gudļevskis was selected by the Tampa Bay Lightning in the fifth round (124th overall) of the 2013 NHL Entry Draft.

Gudļevskis is the only player to have played in the ECHL, AHL, NHL, Olympic Games, and IIHF World Championships in the same season.

Playing career

Europe
Gudļevskis started his professional career in the 2009–10 season playing for HK Ogre of the Latvian Hockey League. In the following season, he moved on to play for Dinamo Riga affiliate HK Rīga of the Minor Hockey League (MHL). He played for three seasons with HK Rīga. Throughout the 2010–11 and 2011–12 seasons, he made the Dinamo Riga roster several times as a healthy scratch. On 5 October 2012, he finally made his debut during a 2–1 overtime win against Vityaz Chekhov, replacing injured Mikael Tellqvist after the second period tied at 0–0. Later in the season he played his first full game as a starter in a 2–0 loss against Sibir Novosibirsk.

Tampa Bay Lightning
Gudļevskis is only the second (after Artūrs Irbe) and highest-ranked Latvian goaltender ever selected in NHL Entry Draft. Dinamo Riga agreed to release Gudļevskis from the final year of his contract; he later signed a three-year entry-level contract with the Tampa Bay Lightning of the National Hockey League (NHL).

Following the Lightning's 2013 pre-season camp, he was reassigned to their ECHL affiliate, the Florida Everblades. While attending pre-season training camp with the Everblades, Gudļevskis was recalled to join the Lightning. He was later reassigned to the Everblades without making the Lightning roster, and made his official North American debut with 20 saves in a 4–1 win over the Orlando Solar Bears.

Gudļevskis was recalled to the Syracuse Crunch of the AHL on 24 October 2013, due to an injury to Riku Helenius. He made his AHL debut on 26 October 2013, with a shutout against the Bridgeport Sound Tigers. Gudļevskis became the fifth goaltender in Crunch history to post a shutout upon debut. After four games with the Crunch, Gudļevskis once again was reassigned to the Everblades. On 7 December 2013, Gudļevskis was promoted to the Syracuse Crunch in order to give him more AHL ice time. Gudļevskis cemented his place on the Crunch roster posting ten wins in 21 games. On 15 January 2014, Gudļevskis was named the CCM/AHL Player of the Week.

On 31 January 2014, due to injuries of Ben Bishop and Anders Lindbäck, Gudļevskis received an emergency call-up to the Lightning along with Cédrick Desjardins. Kristers made his first NHL start on 11 April 2014, in a game between the Lightning and the Columbus Blue Jackets, he stopped 36 shots in a 3–2 win for the Lightning. He made his NHL playoffs debut after replacing Lindbäck mid-game on 18 April 2014 against the Montreal Canadiens in the second game of the first round. He replaced Lindbäck in game four of the series as well. During this season, Gudļevskis became the first goalie in the sport's history to play in an ECHL, AHL, NHL and Olympics in the same season, which also included his Stanley Cup playoffs debut.

On 10 June 2015, in game four of the 2015 Stanley Cup Finals against the Chicago Blackhawks, Gudļevskis became the backup goalie for fellow prospect Andrei Vasilevskiy, who started the game after Ben Bishop was injured in game two (Bishop played injured in game three).

On 24 October 2015, Gudļevskis played in his second NHL regular season game against the Chicago Blackhawks, stopping 31 shots. Though he had a great effort, he lost in overtime 1–0, when a backhand shot slipped by taken from Jonathan Toews.

On 2 July 2016, the Lightning announced the re-signing of Gudļevskis to a one-year, two-way contract. Gudļevskis played in 41 games with the Syracuse Crunch in the 2015–16 AHL season, posting a 16–12–8 record with a 2.83 goals-against average and a .907 save percentage.

New York Islanders
On 1 July 2017, Gudļevskis was traded by the Lightning to the New York Islanders in exchange for Carter Verhaeghe. On 11 July 2017, Gudļevskis signed a one-year, two-way contract with the Islanders. In the following 2017–18 season, Gudļevskis was assigned to AHL affiliate, the Bridgeport Sound Tigers for the duration of the year. In splitting starting duties, he recorded 12 wins in 37 games.

Return to Europe

As an impending restricted free agent with the Islanders and his NHL career stalled after five seasons in North America, Gudļevskis opted to return home by agreeing to a one-year deal with former club Dinamo Riga of the KHL on 21 June 2018. He was released on 1 October 2019, after posting a 3.45 GAA and a .863 save percentage in just nine games.

On 2 December 2019, he signed a contract with the Fischtown Pinguins of the Deutsche Eishockey Liga (DEL).

On 8 October 2020, Gudļevskis signed a one-year contract with EC VSV of the ICE Hockey League.

On 6 February 2021, he signed with HC Slovan Bratislava of the Slovak Extraliga, and then extended his contract with the team on 10 May.

On 1 January 2022, Gudļevskis joined Brynäs IF of the Swedish Hockey League (SHL) until the end of the 2021–22 season.

On 13 June 2022, Gudļevskis signed a one-year contract with Modo Hockey of HockeyAllsvenskan.

International play
Gudļevskis became the starting goaltender for Team Latvia in the 2013 IIHF World Championship after original starter Edgars Masaļskis could not recover game form coming from injury. He registered a 2–2 win-loss record and was named one of the tournament's three best players for Team Latvia.

On 7 January 2014, Gudļevskis was named to the Latvian national team roster for the Sochi 2014 Winter Olympics. Latvia entered the qualification playoff stage ranked as one of the lowest seeds (ahead of only Norway), amassing no points in group play. In the second round, Gudļevskis got the start in the matchup against reigning Olympic champions Canada, despite the Latvian team upsetting Switzerland earlier with Masaļskis.

In what was expected to be a routine victory for the Canadian squad, the Latvian team responded with an early equalizer and managed to stay alive behind Gudļevskis' goaltending (saving 55 of 57 shots he faced) until late into the third period, eventually falling in a 2–1 loss. Gudļevskis was praised, especially in Canadian media and sports commentary, for his performance in the quarter-final against the Canadian national team.

Career statistics

Regular season and playoffs

International

References

External links
 

1992 births
Living people
ASK/Ogre players
Bridgeport Sound Tigers players
Brynäs IF players
Dinamo Riga players
EC VSV players
Fischtown Pinguins players
Florida Everblades players
HC Slovan Bratislava players
HK Riga players
Ice hockey players at the 2014 Winter Olympics
Ice hockey players at the 2022 Winter Olympics
Latvian expatriate ice hockey people
Latvian ice hockey goaltenders
Modo Hockey players
Olympic ice hockey players of Latvia
People from Aizkraukle
Syracuse Crunch players
Tampa Bay Lightning draft picks
Tampa Bay Lightning players
Latvian expatriate sportspeople in the United States
Latvian expatriate sportspeople in Germany
Latvian expatriate sportspeople in Austria
Latvian expatriate sportspeople in Slovakia
Latvian expatriate sportspeople in Sweden
Expatriate ice hockey players in the United States
Expatriate ice hockey players in Germany
Expatriate ice hockey players in Austria
Expatriate ice hockey players in Slovakia
Expatriate ice hockey players in Sweden